Portugal was represented by Madalena Iglésias, with the song "Ele e ela", at the 1966 Eurovision Song Contest, which took place on 5 March in Luxembourg City. "Ele e ela" was chosen as the Portuguese entry at the Grande Prémio TV da Canção Portuguesa on 15 January.

Before Eurovision

Festival da Canção 1966
The Grande Prémio TV da Canção Portuguesa 1966 was held on 15 January 1966 at 22:00 UTC at the Tóbis studios in Lisbon, hosted by Maria Fernanda and Henrique Mendes. Eight songs took part in the final. Jorge Costa Pinto conducted all the songs. The winning song was chosen by a distrital jury, composed by three members, each had 5 votes to be distributed among the songs it intended to award, making a total of 15 votes per district.

At Eurovision 
On the night of the final Iglésias performed 8th in the running order, following Finland and preceding Austria. At the close of the voting the song had received 6 points, coming 13th in the field of 18 competing countries. The Portuguese jury awarded its 5 points to Spain. The orchestra during the Portuguese entry was conducted by Jorge Costa Pinto.

Voting

References 

1966
Countries in the Eurovision Song Contest 1966
Eurovision